Shkrel is a former municipality in the Shkodër County, northwestern Albania. At the 2015 local government reform it became a subdivision of the municipality Malësi e Madhe. The population at the 2011 census was 3,520. Since 2015, Shkrel is part of the Shkreli Regional Nature Park.

Settlements 
There are 12 settlements within Shkrel:

 Bogë
 Bzhetë
 Bzhetë-Makaj
 Dedaj
 Doç-Rrepisht
 Kokë-Papaj
 Lohe e Sipërme
 Qafë-Gradë
 Reç
 Vrith
 Vuç-Kurtaj
 Zagorë (Zagorë-Isufaj and Zagorë-Ndrecaj)

References

External links
 Discovery Kelmend & Shkrel

 
Administrative units of Malësi e Madhe
Former municipalities in Shkodër County